Abeti is both a given name and surname. Notable people with the name include:

 Abeti Masikini (1954–1994), singer from the Belgian Congo
 Abeti Masikini: Le Combat d'Une Femme
 Pasqualino Abeti (born 1948), Italian sprinter